Linus Lindström (born 8 January 1998) is a Swedish professional ice hockey player who is currently playing with  Skellefteå AIK of the Swedish Hockey League (SHL). He was selected by the Calgary Flames in the fourth round, 96th overall, of the 2016 NHL Entry Draft.

Playing career
Lindström made his Swedish Hockey League debut playing with Skellefteå AIK during the 2015–16 SHL season, on 23 February 2016.

During the 2018–19 season, Lindström appeared in 32 games with Skellefteå AIK before he was loaned to HockeyAllsvenskan club, BIK Karlskoga, on 25 January 2019.

Career statistics

Regular season and playoffs

International

References

External links

1998 births
Living people
Bofors IK players
Calgary Flames draft picks
People from Skellefteå Municipality
Skellefteå AIK players
Swedish ice hockey centres
Sportspeople from Västerbotten County